I Gotta Be Me is a web series starring Phaldut Sharma as an actor, Paul Shah, who is given the role of Sammy Davis Jr. in a Rat Pack tribute show. The tribute show is filmed as part of a faux documentary.

The series stars Phaldut Sharma as Paul Shah/Sammy Davis Jr., Martin Rhodes as Frank Sinatra, and Andrew Oliver, David Locke, John Hughes, Karen Kendall, Angela Rhodes, and Chris King as Elvis Presley.

The series has nine episodes:
Faraway Close
I Gotta Be Me
Bums on Seats
The Chairman of the Board
Birth of the Blues...
'How Long Have I Been On?'
That's Life
Why Me?
That's Amore!

References

External links
 

American comedy web series

Cultural depictions of Sammy Davis Jr.
Cultural depictions of Frank Sinatra
Cultural depictions of Elvis Presley